Best Friends Forever is an Indonesian teen drama mystery thriller television series produced by MD Entertainment for Trans TV. The story is a loose adaptation of the popular American TV series Pretty Little Liars. The series premiered on August 8, 2017, and ended on August 27, 2017.

The series follows the lives of four high school students: Tari, Ami, Yuna, and Saras after they schemed to get rid of their friend, Elsa.

Premise 
Tari, Ami, Yuna, and Saras are the most popular girls at school, led by their kind-hearted leader Elsa. On Elsa's birthday, her best friends are throwing her a surprise party, but secretly scheme to take her down by spiking her drink, causing her to fell from the second floor and got into a coma. Eleven months later, the girls received an anonymous message from "BFF" who threatens to expose their crime, unless they come clean. At first, they think it is Elsa herself, but after knowing Elsa is still in a coma, the girls realize that it is somebody else who wants revenge.

A year after the incident, Elsa wakes up. Upon her return to school, Elsa is excited to be reunited with her friends and boyfriend, but only to find them dismissing her. She also finds out her boyfriend, Erick, is now dating Tari who became the new leader of her former friend group. The girls started to bully and torture Elsa with occasional helps from Erick, just as they receive more messages from "BFF", who is going as far as stalking and threatening their lives.

Other main characters are Elsa's new love interest Alfa, and fellow students Fina and Kevin.

Cast 
 Randy Martin as Alfa, a student who becomes Elsa's love interest
 Cassandra Lee as Elsa, the kind leader of her popular clique. Elsa fell into a coma for a year as a result of her friends' scheme.
 Cassandra Lee also portray Elsa's older twin sister, who is "BFF" in the last episode
 Beby Tsabina as Tari, the new leader of the group
 Endy Arfian as Erick, Elsa's former boyfriend who later dates Tari
 Afifah Ifah'nda as Ami
 Jennifer Coppen as Yuna
 Adzwa Aurel as Saras, the smart one of the group
 Nicole Patricia Slee as Fina, a nerd girl who wants to be popular and a regular victim of the girls' bullying. She followed the girls the night the incident happened and knows their secret.

References 

2010s Indonesian television series
2017 Indonesian television series debuts
2017 Indonesian television series endings
Indonesian-language television shows
Indonesian drama television series
Indonesian television soap operas